Rottach is a river of Bavaria, Germany. It is a right tributary of the Iller at the boundary between the municipalities Sulzberg and Rettenberg. Note that there is another river also called Rottach 18 kilometres downstream which is a left tributary of the Iller.

See also
List of rivers of Bavaria

References

Rivers of Bavaria
Rivers of Germany